Radovlja is a settlement northwest of Šmarjeta in the Municipality of Šmarješke Toplice in southeastern Slovenia. The area is part of the historical region of Lower Carniola and is now included in the Southeast Slovenia Statistical Region.

References

External links
Radovlja at Geopedia

Populated places in the Municipality of Šmarješke Toplice